Sayed Shabrawy (born April 1, 1993) is an Egyptian professional footballer who currently plays as a right back for the Egyptian club El-Entag El-Harby. He also represented Egypt at national level, through U-17, U-20, and U-23 levels.

Shabrawy started his career in Al Ahly in 2000, and was promoted to play for the first team in 2014. He then moved to Al Ittihad Alexandria and played for one season, until he moved again in the 2015–16 season on a free transfer, signing a two year contract with Aswan, where he has played most of his professional matches to date. In 2017, he signed a three year contract with El-Entag El-Harby.

References

External links
Sayed Shabrawy at KOOORA.com

1993 births
Living people
Egyptian footballers
Egyptian Premier League players
Association football defenders
Al Ahly SC players
Al Ittihad Alexandria Club players
Aswan SC players
El Entag El Harby SC players